Mountain Grove Bandstand is a historic bandstand located in the town square at Mountain Grove, Wright County, Missouri.  It was built in 1915, and is a stucco covered American Craftsman style open bandstand.  It is a small square structure measuring 14 feet, 3 inches, on a side. It was dedicated by Vice President Thomas R. Marshall.

It was listed on the National Register of Historic Places in 1989.

References

Event venues on the National Register of Historic Places in Missouri
Bungalow architecture in Missouri
Buildings and structures completed in 1915
Buildings and structures in Wright County, Missouri
National Register of Historic Places in Wright County, Missouri